The naval battle of Mizushima took place on 17 November 1183 during the Genpei War. One of the most important bases of the Taira was Yashima, a small island off the coast of Shikoku. In November 1183, Minamoto no Yoshinaka sent an army to cross the Inland Sea to Yashima, but they were caught by the Taira just offshore of Mizushima (水島), a small island of Bitchu Province, just off Honshū. The Taira tied their ships together and placed planks across them to form a flat fighting surface.

The battle began with Taira archers loosing a rain of arrows upon the Minamoto boats; when the boats were close enough, daggers and swords were drawn, and the two sides engaged in hand-to-hand combat. Finally, the Taira, who had brought fully equipped horses on their ships, swam to the shore with their steeds, and routed the remaining Minamoto warriors.

References

1180s in Japan
1183 in Asia
Mizushima 1183
Mizushima